Golden Boy is a New Zealand comedy television series.

Premise
The series follows aspiring journalist Mitch, sister of star rugby player Tama – with whom their small hometown is obsessed.

Cast and characters
 Hayley Sproull as Mitch
 Kimberley Crossman as Lisa
 Rima Te Wiata as Susan
 Dean O'Gorman as Aussie Dave
 James Rolleston as Tama
 Erana James as Kahu
 Alison Bruce as Carol
 Rawiri Paratene as Bertie

Series overview

Episodes

References

External links

English-language television shows
2019 New Zealand television series debuts
New Zealand television sitcoms
Television shows funded by NZ on Air
Television shows set in New Zealand
Three (TV channel) original programming